Lillian Richter (1915–2000) was an American lithographer. Richter did work for the Works Progress Administration (WPA). Her work is included in the collections of the Smithsonian American Art Museum, the Metropolitan Museum of Art, the Art Institute of Chicago and the National Gallery of Art, Washington

References

1915 births
2000 deaths
Artists from Newport, Rhode Island
American lithographers
20th-century American women artists
20th-century American printmakers
20th-century lithographers
Women lithographers
American women printmakers
Artists in the Smithsonian American Art Museum collection